Steve Evans (1957/58 – 16 September 2017) was an English professional rugby league footballer who played in the 1970s and 1980s.

Club career

Featherstone Rovers
Evans joined Featherstone Rovers in 1976 and was a member of the squad that won the 1976–77 Championship. The following season he played  in Featherstone Rovers' 7–17 defeat by Castleford in the 1977 Yorkshire Cup Final during the 1977–78 season at  Headingley, Leeds on Saturday 15 October 1977.

Steve Evans won caps for Yorkshire while at Featherstone Rovers; during the 1979–80 season against Cumbria and Lancashire, and during the 1981–82 season as an  interchange/substitute against Cumbria.

Hull
In 1982 he was transferred to Hull F.C. for a fee of £70,000.  At Hull he appeared in three Challenge Cup finals, the first in 1982 when he played left- in Hull FC's 14–14 draw with Widnes in the 1982 Challenge Cup Final  at Wembley Stadium, London on Saturday 1 May 1982, in front of a crowd of 92,147, and played left- in the 18–9 victory over Widnes in the replay at Elland Road, Leeds on Wednesday 19 May 1982, in front of a crowd of 41,171.

The following year he played at right- in Hull's 12–14 defeat by his old side Featherstone.

Evans played  in Hull's 0–12 defeat by Hull Kingston Rovers in the 1984–85 John Player Special Trophy Final at Boothferry Park on Saturday 26 January 1985.

Later career
Evans left Hull in 1986 and had short careers at Bradford Northern and Wakefield Trinity before retiring as a player.

Between 2004 and 2006 he was chairman of Featherstone Rovers.

International career
Evans won caps for England while at Featherstone Rovers in 1979 against France, in 1980 against Wales, and France, and won caps for Great Britain while at Featherstone Rovers in 1979 against Australia, Australia (sub) (2 matches), and New Zealand (3 matches), in 1980 against New Zealand, and New Zealand (sub).

While playing at Hull FC, Evans was selected to play in two of Great Britain's three games against Australia for the 1982 Ashes, scoring the Lions' sole try of the series.

References

External links
 (archived by web.archive.org) Stats → PastPlayers → E at hullfc.com
 (archived by web.archive.org) Statistics at hullfc.com

1950s births
2017 deaths
English rugby league players
Rugby league centres
Rugby league five-eighths
Rugby league wingers
Featherstone Rovers players
Hull F.C. players
Bradford Bulls players
Wakefield Trinity players
Sheffield Eagles (1984) players
Yorkshire rugby league team players
England national rugby league team players
Great Britain national rugby league team players